The 3rd constituency of Eure-et-Loir is a French legislative constituency in the Eure-et-Loir département.

Assembly Members

Election results

2022 

 
 
|-
| colspan="8" bgcolor="#E9E9E9"|
|-

2017

2012

2007

References

Sources
 Official results of French elections from 1998: 

3